The Seattle Air Route Traffic Control Center (or ZSE or Seattle Center or Seattle ARTCC) is the area control center responsible for controlling and ensuring proper separation of IFR aircraft in Washington state, most of Oregon, and parts of Idaho, Montana, Nevada, and California, as well as the neighboring area into the Pacific Ocean.

The control center is located at 3101 Auburn Way S, Auburn, Washington, which is 11.5 miles (18.5 km) from SeaTac International, the only Class B airport served by the center.

Airports served

Class B
 SEA/KSEA Seattle-Tacoma International Airport

Class C
The following Class C airports in the Seattle ARTCC have continuously operating control towers:
 Fairchild AFB
 Portland International Airport
 Naval Air Station Whidbey Island
 Spokane International Airport

Class D
The following are Class D airports in the Seattle ARTCC. Those with continuously operating control towers (as opposed to control towers closed during the night) are italicized.
 Bellingham International Airport
 Boeing Field
 Eastern Oregon Regional Airport
 Felts Field
 Grant County International Airport
 Gray AAF (Lewis-McChord AFB)
 Klamath Falls Airport
 Lewiston–Nez Perce County Airport
 Mahlon Sweet/Eugene Airport
 McChord AFB
 McNary/Salem Airport
 Olympia Regional Airport
 Portland-Hillsboro Airport
 Portland-Troutdale Airport
 Renton Municipal Airport
 Roberts FIeld/Redmond Airport
 Rogue Valley International–Medford Airport
 Paine Field/Snohomish County Airport
 Southwest Oregon Regional Airport
 Tacoma Narrows Airport
 Tri-Cities Airport
 Walla Walla Regional Airport
 Yakima Air Terminal

Class E
The following airports in the Seattle ARTCC airspace are nontowered, Class E airports:
 Arcata
 Astoria Rgnl
 Burns
 Bowerman
 Bremerton Natl
 Coeur d'Alene
 Deer Park
 Ephrata
 Fairchild Intl
 McNamara
 Newport
 Pangborn
 Pullman

Subdivisions

Control area

References

External links
 Seattle Center Weather Service Unit (CWSU) (NWS/FAA)

Air traffic control centers
Air traffic control in the United States
Transportation in Washington (state)
Aviation in Washington (state)